The Votive Temple of Maipú or Basilica of Our Lady of Mount Carmel is a Catholic church located in the Chilean town of Maipú. Its construction was ordered by Bernardo O'Higgins in 1818 as an act of thanksgiving to Our Lady of Mount Carmel for the intercession for the victory of the Chilean Army in the Battle of Maipú, where the Independence of Chile was assured. It is called votive because of the vows that O'Higgins made to the Virgin Mary.

History

After its construction was decreed on May 7, 1818, on November 15 the same year the first stone of the Victory Chapel or Votive Church of Maipú was laid and blessed. After 64 years of intermittent construction due to lack of resources, the old church was solemnly inaugurated. But in 1906, a violent earthquake made it necessary to rebuild the church. On December 8, 1942, the Marian congress that was held in Santiago reached the sole agreement to build a great sanctuary in Maipú, on the grounds of the old Chapel of Victory to honor Our Lady of Mount Carmel.

Thus, on July 16, 1948, the Archbishop of Santiago Monsignor José María Caro ordered the construction of the new building. The work was delayed due to lack of resources but finally on October 24, 1974, and thanks to the Fundación Nacional Voto O'Higgins (on which the church depends today), the Votive Temple of Maipú was solemnly inaugurated.

Initially, the project was conceived to transform the site into a large mausoleum where the remains of the Heroes of the Homeland and the most notable Chileans would rest, similar to the Panthéon in Paris, but the church opposed this initiative and preferred to transform it into a shrine, dedicated exclusively to Catholic worship and the spiritual care of pilgrims.

On November 23, 1974, the Bishops of Chile, presided over by Cardinal Archbishop of Santiago, Monsignor Raúl Silva Henríquez, consecrated the church. On October 26, 1984 the church was declared a historical monument by Supreme Decree No. 645. On January 27, 1987, the church was declared a basilica.

The image

The image of Our Lady of Mount Carmel, venerated in the church, is a wooden sculpture brought to Chile in 1785 by Martín de Lecuna for his oratory. The image was donated to the Cardinal Archbishop of Santiago, Monsignor José María Caro by Doña Rosalía Mujica de Gutiérrez, a descendant of Don Martín de Lecuna, in August 1945. 

On April 3, 1987, the image was crowned as Queen and Patroness of Chile by Pope John Paul II during his apostolic visit to Chile, ratifying the decree of Pope Pius XI in 1923 that granted such distinction.

Viewpoint

Just below the bell tower of the temple ( high) there is a scenic viewpoint. The space was inaugurated on April 3, 2012, coinciding with the twenty-fifth anniversary of John Paul II's visit to Chile. It can be accessed by elevator or by a staircase of 323 steps. The viewpoint has audiovisual equipment to display informative content to visitors, and inside is a compass rose that indicates the location of various Marian sanctuaries around the world.

References

External links

 Official website (in Spanish)
 Information about the sanctuary (in Spanish)

Churches in Santiago, Chile
Modernist architecture in Chile